Valentina Mikhaylovna Borisenko (née Belova; ; Cherepovets, 28 January 1920 – Saint Petersburg, 6 March 1993) was a Soviet chess player.

She was a five-time winner of the Women's Soviet Championship: 1945, 1955, 1957, 1960, and 1961 (a record shared with Nona Gaprindashvili).

She won the Leningrad women's chess championship seven times (1940, 1945, 1950, 1951, 1954, 1955, and 1956), and four times the RSFSR women's championship.

In the Women's World Chess Championship 1949–50 she tied for 3rd–4th with Elisaveta Bykova.

In 1970 she was equal first with Waltraud Nowarra in the international tournament at Halle.

In 1977 she was awarded by FIDE the Honorary title of Woman Grandmaster for her results in the years 1945-1970.

Her husband was Russian correspondence chess player Georgy Borisenko, who also trained her to play chess.

References

External links
Valentina M Belova chess games at 365Chess.com

Chess woman grandmasters
Russian female chess players
Soviet female chess players
1920 births
1993 deaths
20th-century chess players